Jeppe Normann (born 15 September 1951) is a Norwegian épée and foil fencer. He competed at the 1972, 1976 and 1984 Summer Olympics.

References

External links
 

1951 births
Living people
Norwegian male épée fencers
Olympic fencers of Norway
Fencers at the 1972 Summer Olympics
Fencers at the 1976 Summer Olympics
Fencers at the 1984 Summer Olympics
Sportspeople from Oslo
Norwegian male foil fencers
20th-century Norwegian people